Umarda is a village in Udaipur district in the Indian state of Rajasthan. As per Population Census 2011, the total population of Umarda is 4,506, literacy rate of Umarda village was 49.8 % which is very low compared to 66.11 % of Rajasthan. The District head quarter of the village is Udaipur.

Education
Umarda is home to various government, deemed and private school and colleges. RR Dental College & Hospital, SS College and Pacific Institute Of Medical Sciences are the major government colleges in Umarda.

See also
Umarda Railway Station

References 

Villages in Udaipur district